Diarsia dimorpha is a moth of the family Noctuidae. It is endemic to Luzon.

It was first described by Alfred Ernest Wileman and West in 1928.

Diarsia
Moths described in 1928